Dalakhani (16 February 2000 – 15 January 2021) was an Irish thoroughbred race horse owned and bred by Aga Khan IV and trained by Alain de Royer-Dupré. therefore half-brother to Daylami.

Racing career
Dalakhani won four Group One races: Critérium International as a 2-year old, Prix Lupin, Prix du Jockey Club, and Prix de l'Arc de Triomphe. He was beaten by half a length in the Irish Derby by another Aga Khan Studs horse, Alamshar. He also won two G2 races; overall he won eight of nine starts. In 2003, Dalakhani was voted European Horse of the Year.

Stud career
In 2004, Dalakhani was standing at Gilltown Stud.

In 2008, Dalakhani's colt Conduit won the St. Leger Stakes, the third and longest leg of England's Triple Crown, as well as the Breeder's Cup Turf at Santa Anita. His progeny also include Duncan, Integral and Reliable Man.

Dalakhani was moved to Haras de Bonneval for 2016 and was retired from stud in July 2016. Died on 15 January 2021.

Notable progeny

Dalakhani has sired 10 individual Group 1 winners:

c = colt, f = filly, g = gelding''

Pedigree

References

 Dalakhani's pedigree and racing statistics
 Dalakhani's photo

2000 racehorse births
2021 racehorse deaths
Racehorses bred in Ireland
Racehorses trained in France
Arc winners
European Thoroughbred Horse of the Year
Thoroughbred family 9-e